Okęcie is the largest neighbourhood of the Włochy district of Warsaw, Poland.

It is the location of Warsaw Chopin Airport and the PZL Warszawa-Okęcie aircraft works, and home to the Okęcie Warszawa professional association football club.

In 1939-1951 the village was a seat of Okęcie gmina. Since 1951 it has been a part of Warsaw.

Name
Okęcie owes its name to its location in the corner of the Rakov estate. In 16th century, the owners of the village started to use a different surname: Okęccy of Radwan coat of arms.

Religious communities
Roman Catholic Church:
Parish of St. Francis of Assisi in Okęcie
Polish Autocephalous Orthodox Church:
Field Cathedral of St. George the Victorious
Jehovah's Witnesses:
Church and the hall of the kingdom.

Links 
 okecie.net
 Ośrodek Sportu i Rekreacji
 Zespole Szkół im. Bohaterów Narwiku

Neighbourhoods of Włochy